Kamalaldin Mallash (born 1 January 1992) is a Syrian-born Qatari handball player for Al Rayyan and the Qatari national team.

References

External links

1992 births
Living people
Qatari male handball players
Asian Games medalists in handball
Handball players at the 2014 Asian Games
Handball players at the 2016 Summer Olympics
Olympic handball players of Qatar
Asian Games gold medalists for Qatar
Naturalised citizens of Qatar
Qatari people of Syrian descent
Syrian handball players
Medalists at the 2014 Asian Games